Sir Henry Norman, 1st Baronet  (19 September 18584 June 1939) was an English journalist and Liberal Member of Parliament and government minister. Norman was educated privately in France and at Harvard University, where he obtained his B.A. For several years he worked on the editorial staff of the Pall Mall Gazette and later joined the editorial staff of the Daily Chronicle, being appointed Assistant Editor of the latter in 1895. He retired from journalism in 1899. During this time he travelled widely in Canada and the United States and in Russia, Japan, China, Siam, Malaya and Central Asia. Much of the material included in the two volumes mentioned in the description was amassed during these tours. He was knighted in 1906, and made a baronet in 1915.

Family and education
Norman was born in Leicester, the son of Henry Norman, a merchant and local radical politician. Norman was educated at Leicester Collegiate School and Grove House School and later studied theology and philosophy at Leipzig and Harvard University. His family were Unitarians in religion and Norman first embarked in a career as a preacher but he gave up this calling and his religion on his return to England.

In 1891 he married author Ménie Muriel Dowie (1867–1945) but they divorced in 1903 on the grounds of her adultery with a family friend, Edward Arthur Fitzgerald. Norman was awarded custody of their son Henry Nigel St Valery Norman who was born in 1897.

In 1907 he married Florence Priscilla McLaren (1884–1964), the daughter of the wealthy industrialist and Liberal MP, Sir Charles McLaren. They had three children.

In 1922 he purchased Ramster Hall, Chiddingfold, Guildford, Surrey with Lady Norman.

Journalism
Norman became a journalist working for the Pall Mall Gazette and the New York Times. As a journalist he was famous for uncovering the truth behind the Dreyfus Affair. He was on the staff of the Daily Chronicle from 1892, becoming assistant editor. Norman travelled extensively in the East, where he took a number of photographs that are held at Cambridge University. Later he founded and edited the magazine The World's Work (vols 1-42 1902-1923).

Business
He was appointed Assistant Postmaster-General in 1910 and his interest in international communications led to a number of appointments related to wireless and telegraphy, among them Chairman of the War Office Committee on Wireless Telegraphy 1912, and Chairman of the Imperial Wireless Telegraphy Committee of 1920, the latter convened to draw up a complete wireless scheme for the Empire. He was an early advocate of wireless broadcasting, opening the All British Wireless Exhibition at the Royal Horticultural Hall, Westminster in 1922 at which he predicted the ubiquitous uptake, to a very sceptical press, of the technology into all homes.

In other business, Norman was a director of a number of companies connected to the coal mining and iron trades industries.

World War One

Sir Henry was the Munitions Inventions Department's permanent attaché to the French Ministry of Inventions. At the end of the war Sir Henry got involved in the detailed planning for a proposed transatlantic flight using a F.B.27. Vickers Vimy. This planning included the route to be flown and of course, the hangar facilities and the provision of fuel needed for preparation of the aircraft in Newfoundland.

Politics

Norman was a Liberal Member of Parliament for Wolverhampton South from 1900 to 1910, and for Blackburn from 1910 to 1923. He was an advocate for a number of causes, notably women's suffrage. He was created Baronet of Honeyhanger in the Parish of Shottermill in the County of Surrey, in 1915. In 1918 he was admitted to the Privy Council. In January 1910 he was appointed Assistant Postmaster General, a position which fitted well with his interests in wireless communications. He sat on the War Office Committee on Wireless Telegraphy in 1912. In 1914, he became the first President of the Derby Wireless Club, founded in 1911. He was Chairman of the Imperial Wireless Telegraphy Committee from 1919, (The Norman Committee), which recommended wireless communications covering a range of 2,000 miles. He contributed to government committees including chairing a Select Committee on Patent Medicines (specifically advertisements for them and fraudulent claims), on rent restrictions, on betting duty and on industrial paints. He championed the rights and regulation of motorists in the House of Commons even though he had himself been fined for speeding (30 mph) under a scheme he himself had advocated to the Royal Commission. Norman was appointed a Justice of the Peace for Surrey.

Norman was a supporter of David Lloyd George, organising the Budget League in support of his People's Budget in 1909–10, personally representing Lloyd George in France on a number of occasions during the First World War, and helping organise the government's campaign during the "Coupon Election" of 1918.

Selected writings
 An Account of the Harvard Greek Play (1881)
 The Preservation of Niagara Falls (1882)
 The Real Japan (1892)
 The Peoples and Politics of the Far East (1895)
 The Treatment and Training of Disabled and Discharged Soldiers in France (1917)
 All the Russias (1902)
 Will No Man Understand? a play, (1934)
 Bodyke : A Chapter in the History of Irish Landlordism  (1887)

Notes

References 
 
 
 Obituary, The Times, 5 June 1939
 Patrick French, The Life of Henry Norman. Unicorn Press 1995
 Who was Who, OUP 2007

External links 

 
 
 

English male journalists
1858 births
1939 deaths
Baronets in the Baronetage of the United Kingdom
Liberal Party (UK) MPs for English constituencies
UK MPs 1900–1906
UK MPs 1906–1910
UK MPs 1910–1918
UK MPs 1918–1922
UK MPs 1922–1923
Politics of Blackburn with Darwen
People educated at Leicester Collegiate School
Harvard University alumni
English justices of the peace
Members of the Privy Council of the United Kingdom
Henry
National Liberal Party (UK, 1922) politicians
Knights Bachelor
Politicians awarded knighthoods